The 2019 Central and Western District Council election was held on 24 November 2019 to elect all 15 members of the Central and Western District Council.

Amid the ongoing pro-democracy protests, the pro-democrats scored a historic landslide victory by taking 14 of the 15 seats, with DAB being completely wiped out from the council and its legislator Cheung Kwok-kwan being ousted in Sai Wan.

Overall election results
Before election:

Change in composition:

Results by constituency

A01: Chung Wan

A02: Mid Levels East

A03: Castle Road

A04: Peak

A05: University

A06: Kwun Lung

A07: Kennedy Town & Mount Davis

A08: Sai Wan

A09: Belcher

A10: Shek Tong Tsui

A11: Sai Ying Pun

A12: Sheung Wan

A13: Tung Wah

A14: Centre Street

A15: Water Street

References

2019 Hong Kong local elections
Central and Western District Council elections